Theodore Johnson may refer to:
 Theodore Johnson (politician) (1903–1992), member of the Pennsylvania House of Representatives.
 Theodore Johnson (serial killer) (born 1954), Jamaican-born English serial killer
 Theodore Johnson (Tuskegee Airman) (1924–2020), African-American aviator
 J. Theodore Johnson (1902–1963), American artist and muralist

See also
 Teddy Johnson (1919–2018), half of the English husband-and-wife team of entertainers Pearl Carr & Teddy Johnson
 Theophilus Johnson (1836–1919), English amateur naturalist, artist and publisher